Taraxacum mirabile is a type of dandelion that grows between 800 and 1300 meters on salty soils (especially endemic in Lake Tuz) in northern and central Turkey.

References

mirabile
Endemic flora of Turkey
Halophytes
Plants described in 1962